Joseph "Jo Mersa" Marley (March 12, 1991 – December 27, 2022) was a Jamaican reggae artist. He was a son of Stephen Marley and grandson of reggae musician Bob Marley.

Career
Marley debuted in 2014 releasing, through iTunes and Spotify, an EP "Comfortable". He also appeared on a Grammy-winning album Strictly Roots by Morgan Heritage.

Personal life
Marley spent his early years in Jamaica, where he attended Saints Peter and Paul Preparatory School, before moving to Florida to attend Miami Palmetto Senior High School and Miami Dade College (where he studied studio engineering).

On December 27, 2022, Marley died in Miami-Dade County, Florida.

Discography 
 Comfortable EP (2014)
Eternal (2021)

References

External links
 
 

1991 births
2022 deaths
21st-century Jamaican male singers
American Rastafarians
Grammy Award winners
Jamaican people of Cuban descent
Jamaican people of English descent
Jamaican Rastafarians
Jamaican reggae singers
J
Jamaican people of Chinese descent
Musicians from Kingston, Jamaica